Michael Karoli (29 April 1948 – 17 November 2001) was a German guitarist, violinist and composer. He was a founding member of the influential krautrock band Can.

Career
Karoli was born and grew up in Straubing, Bavaria, moving to St. Gallen, Switzerland by the time he finished school. He learned to play the guitar, violin and cello as a child, and played in numerous jazz and dance bands. In 1966, he met and befriended Holger Czukay, who was his guitar teacher for a while.
After he graduated he began studies of the law until leaving in 1968 to form Can with Czukay, Irmin Schmidt, Jaki Liebezeit, and David Johnson. In Can, he mostly played guitar, occasionally also playing violin; after Damo Suzuki left in late 1973 he was also their main vocalist.
He was a constant member of the band, playing with it between 1968 and its break-up in 1979. He also joined the band for its three reunions, in 1986, 1991, and 1999.

Karoli died from an undisclosed form of cancer in 2001 in Essen, Germany, aged 53.

Family 
Karoli's sister, Constanze Karoli, and then-girlfriend Eveline Grunwald are the models on the cover of Roxy Music's 1974 album Country Life.

Discography
Solo
 Deluge (1984) with Polly Eltes

Can

 See Can discography

References

External links
Michael Karoli's page at the official Can website

1948 births
2001 deaths
People from Straubing
Musicians from Essen
Anarcho-punk musicians
German violinists
German expatriates in Switzerland
German male violinists
Deaths from cancer in Germany
German rock guitarists
German male guitarists
Can (band) members
20th-century violinists
20th-century guitarists
20th-century German male musicians
20th-century German musicians

German anarchists